The 2019 NHK Trophy was the sixth event of the 2019–20 ISU Grand Prix of Figure Skating, a senior-level international invitational competition series. It was held at Makomanai Ice Arena in Sapporo, Japan from November 22–24. Medals were awarded in the disciplines of men's singles, ladies' singles, pair skating, and ice dance. Skaters earned points toward qualifying for the 2019–20 Grand Prix Final.

Entries
The ISU announced the preliminary assignments on June 20, 2019.

Changes to preliminary assignments

Records

The following new ISU best scores were set during this competition:

Results

Men

Ladies

Pairs

Ice dance
Gabriella Papadakis / Guillaume Cizeron of France became the first team in history to score over 90 points for the rhythm dance.

References

NHK Trophy
2019 in figure skating
2019 in Japanese sport
NHK Trophy